T. Venkata Reddy is an Indian politician and former Member of the Legislative Assembly of Tamil Nadu. He was elected to the Tamil Nadu legislative assembly from Hosur constituency as an Indian National Congress (Indira) candidate in 1980 election, and as an Indian National Congress candidate in 1984 election.

References 

Living people
Year of birth missing (living people)
Tamil Nadu MLAs 1985–1989
Indian National Congress politicians from Tamil Nadu